Rožnov is name of several places in the Czech Republic:

Rožnov pod Radhoštěm, a town in the Zlín Region
Rožnov (Náchod District), a village in the Hradec Králové Region